Bromberg, or Bydgoszcz, is a city in Poland.

Bromberg may also refer to:

Bromberg (region), a former administrative region of Prussia
Kreis Bromberg, a former district of the Bromberg administrative region
Bromberg, Lower Austria, a town in Austria
Bromberg (Schönbuch), a hill in Baden-Württemberg, Germany
Bromberg (surname), a list of people with the name
Bromberg's, a jewelry and gift retailer in Birmingham, Alabama, US
Treaty of Bromberg, treaty between John II Casimir of Poland and Elector Frederick William of Brandenburg-Prussia

See also
Nazi concentration camps near Bydgoszcz, Poland
Bromberg-Ost

 
Bromberger (disambiguation)